The United Agrarians are a political party in Bulgaria. The conservative agrarian party was established in 2008 after a split within the Agrarian People's Union. It is currently led by Anastasia Dimitrova-Moser.

External links
 Official website

2008 establishments in Bulgaria
Agrarian parties in Bulgaria
Political parties established in 2008